Ivo Machado Rodrigues (born October 15, 1960) is a former marathon runner from Brazil. He won the gold medal at the 1987 Pan American Games and competed for his native country at the 1988 Summer Olympics, finishing in 56th place.

Achievements
All results regarding marathon, unless stated otherwise

External links

 
 

1960 births
Living people
Brazilian male long-distance runners
Olympic athletes of Brazil
Athletes (track and field) at the 1988 Summer Olympics
Athletes (track and field) at the 1987 Pan American Games
Pan American Games athletes for Brazil
Pan American Games medalists in athletics (track and field)
Pan American Games gold medalists for Brazil
Medalists at the 1987 Pan American Games
21st-century Brazilian people
20th-century Brazilian people